Kermadecia is a genus of flowering plants in the family Proteaceae. The genus comprises five species, all endemic to New Caledonia. Its closest relatives are Sleumerodendron (New Caledonia) and Turrillia (Fiji, Vanuatu), of which the species have once been placed in Kermadecia.

Species
Kermadecia brinoniae H.C.Hopkins & Pillon
Kermadecia elliptica Brongn. & Gris 
Kermadecia pronyensis (Guillaumin) Guillaumin
Kermadecia rotundifolia Brongn. & Gris 
Kermadecia sinuata Brongn. & Gris

References

 
Endemic flora of New Caledonia
Proteaceae genera
Taxonomy articles created by Polbot
Taxa named by Jean Antoine Arthur Gris
Taxa named by Adolphe-Théodore Brongniart